Washington Township is one of seventeen townships in Appanoose County, Iowa, United States. As of the 2010 census, its population was 722.

History
Washington Township was founded in 1848.

Geography
According to the USGS, it contains six cemeteries: Garland, Hardin, Orleans, Otterbein South, Otterbien and Sunnyview.

References

External links
 US-Counties.com
 City-Data.com

Townships in Appanoose County, Iowa
Townships in Iowa
Populated places established in 1848
1848 establishments in Iowa